Melvin L. Larsen (born October 19, 1936) is an American politician from the State of Michigan.

He was born in Clinton, Iowa, and later resided in Oxford Oakland County, Michigan. Larsen was a member of the Michigan State House of Representatives 61st District, 1973–1978 and a candidate for Michigan Secretary of State in 1978.  He was elected Chairman of the Michigan Republican Party from 1979 to 1981. In 1976, he was one of the authors of the Elliott-Larsen Civil Rights Act of Michigan. This was a major anti-discrimination law in Michigan and touched upon fair housing, age discrimination, and sex discrimination. Currently, Melvin Larsen is President of Larsen & Associates of Southfield, Michigan.

References 

 

1936 births
Living people
American people of Norwegian descent
Members of the Michigan House of Representatives
Michigan Republican Party chairs
People from Oxford, Michigan
20th-century American politicians